PLOS Computational Biology is a monthly peer-reviewed open access scientific journal covering  computational biology. It was established in 2005 by the Public Library of Science in association with the International Society for Computational Biology (ISCB) in the same format as the previously established PLOS Biology and PLOS Medicine. The founding editor-in-chief was Philip Bourne and the current ones are Feilim Mac Gabhann and Jason Papin.

Format
The journal publishes both original research and review articles. All articles are open access and licensed under the Creative Commons Attribution License. 

Since its inception, the journal has published the Ten Simple Rules series of practical guides, which has subsequently become one of the journals most read article series. 

The Ten Simple Rules series then led to the Quick Tips collection, whose articles contain recommendations on computational practices and methods, such as dimensionality reduction for example.

In 2012, it launched the Topic Page review format, which dual-publishes peer-reviewed articles both in the journal and on Wikipedia. It was the first publication of its kind to publish in this way.

See also 
PLOS
PLOS Biology
BMC Bioinformatics

References

External links 

 PLOS Computational Biology - List of quick tips articles
 PLOS Computational Biology - List of ten simple rules articles

Creative Commons Attribution-licensed journals
Bioinformatics and computational biology journals
Monthly journals
English-language journals
Publications established in 2005
PLOS academic journals